The 2015–16 QMJHL season is the 47th season of the Quebec Major Junior Hockey League (QMJHL). The regular season began on September 10, 2015, and ended on March 19, 2016.

The playoffs began shortly after the end of the regular season, and ended on May 12, 2016; the winning team, the Rouyn-Noranda Huskies, was awarded the President's Cup and a berth in the 2016 Memorial Cup held at ENMAX Centrium in Red Deer, Alberta.  The Red Deer Rebels of the WHL have qualified for the tournament as the host team.

Regular season standings

Note: GP = Games played; W = Wins; L = Losses; OTL = Overtime losses; SL = Shootout losses; GF = Goals for; GA = Goals against; PTS = Points; x = clinched playoff berth; y = clinched division title

Scoring leaders
Note: GP = Games played; G = Goals; A = Assists; Pts = Points; PIM = Penalty minutes

Leading goaltenders
Note: GP = Games played; Mins = Minutes played; W = Wins; L = Losses: OTL = Overtime losses; SL = Shootout losses; GA = Goals Allowed; SO = Shutouts; GAA = Goals against average

2016 President's Cup playoffs

First round

(1) Rouyn-Noranda Huskies vs. (16) Drummondville Voltigeurs

(2) Shawinigan Cataractes vs. (15) Sherbrooke Phoenix

(3) Saint John Sea Dogs vs. (14) Acadie–Bathurst Titan

(4) Val-d'Or Foreurs vs. (13) Blainville-Boisbriand Armada

(5) Gatineau Olympiques vs. (12) Quebec Remparts

(6) Moncton Wildcats vs. (11) Victoriaville Tigres

(7) Cape Breton Screaming Eagles vs. (10) Chicoutimi Saguenéens

(8) Rimouski Océanic vs. (9) Charlottetown Islanders

Quarter-finals

(1) Rouyn-Noranda Huskies vs. (13) Blainville-Boisbriand Armada

(2) Shawinigan Cataractes vs. (9) Charlottetown Islanders

(3) Saint John Sea Dogs vs. (7) Cape Breton Screaming Eagles

(5) Gatineau Olympiques vs. (6) Moncton Wildcats

Semi-finals

(1) Rouyn-Noranda Huskies vs. (6) Moncton Wildcats

(2) Shawinigan Cataractes vs. (3) Saint John Sea Dogs

President's Cup Finals

(1) Rouyn-Noranda Huskies vs. (2) Shawinigan Cataractes

Playoff scoring leaders
Note: GP = Games played; G = Goals; A = Assists; Pts = Points; PIM = Penalty minutes

Playoff leading goaltenders

Note: GP = Games played; Mins = Minutes played; W = Wins; L = Losses: OTL = Overtime losses; SL = Shootout losses; GA = Goals Allowed; SO = Shutouts; GAA = Goals against average

Memorial Cup

Trophies and awards
President's Cup – Playoff Champions: Rouyn-Noranda Huskies
Jean Rougeau Trophy – Regular Season Champions: Rouyn-Noranda Huskies
Luc Robitaille Trophy – Team that scored the most goals: Rouyn-Noranda Huskies
Robert Lebel Trophy – Team with best GAA: Gatineau Olympiques

Player
Michel Brière Memorial Trophy – Most Valuable Player: Francis Perron, Rouyn-Noranda Huskies
Jean Béliveau Trophy – Top Scorer: Conor Garland, Moncton Wildcats
Guy Lafleur Trophy – Playoff MVP: Francis Perron, Rouyn-Noranda Huskies
Jacques Plante Memorial Trophy – Top Goaltender: Chase Marchand, Rouyn-Noranda Huskies
Guy Carbonneau Trophy – Best Defensive Forward: Shawn Ouellette-St-Amant, Val-d'Or Foreurs
Emile Bouchard Trophy – Defenceman of the Year: Samuel Girard, Shawinigan Cataractes
Kevin Lowe Trophy – Best Defensive Defenceman: Allan Carron, Rouyn-Noranda Huskies
Michael Bossy Trophy – Top Prospect: Pierre-Luc Dubois, Cape Breton Screaming Eagles
RDS Cup – Rookie of the Year: Vitalii Abramov, Gatineau Olympiques
Michel Bergeron Trophy – Offensive Rookie of the Year: Vitalii Abramov, Gatineau Olympiques
Raymond Lagacé Trophy – Defensive Rookie of the Year: Mathieu Bellemare, Gatineau Olympiques
Frank J. Selke Memorial Trophy – Most sportsmanlike player: Samuel Girard, Shawinigan Cataractes
QMJHL Humanitarian of the Year – Humanitarian of the Year: Samuel Laberge, Rimouski Océanic
Marcel Robert Trophy – Best Scholastic Player: Alexis D'Aoust, Shawinigan Cataractes
Paul Dumont Trophy – Personality of the Year: Pierre-Luc Dubois, Cape Breton Screaming Eagles

Executive
Ron Lapointe Trophy – Coach of the Year: Gilles Bouchard, Rouyn-Noranda Huskies
Maurice Filion Trophy – General Manager of the Year: Gilles Bouchard, Rouyn-Noranda Huskies
John Horman Trophy – Executive of the Year: 
Jean Sawyer Trophy – Marketing Director of the Year:

All-Star Teams 
First All-Star Team:
 Étienne Montpetit, Goaltender, Val-d'Or Foreurs
 Philippe Myers, Defenceman, Rouyn-Noranda Huskies
 Samuel Girard, Defenceman, Shawinigan Cataractes
 Nicolas Roy, Centre, Chicoutimi Saguenéens
 Francis Perron, Left Wing, Rouyn-Noranda Huskies
 Conor Garland, Right Wing, Moncton Wildcats

Second All-Star Team:
 Julio Billia, Goaltender, Chicoutimi Saguenéens
 Thomas Chabot, Defenceman, Saint John Sea Dogs
 Jeremy Lauzon, Defenceman, Rouyn-Noranda Huskies
 Anthony Beauregard, Centre, Val-d'Or Foreurs
 Pierre-Luc Dubois, Left Wing, Cape Breton Screaming Eagles
 Alexis D'Aoust, Right Wing, Shawinigan Cataractes

All-Rookie Team:
 Mathieu Bellemare, Goaltender, Gatineau Olympiques
 Zachary Lauzon, Defenceman, Rouyn-Noranda Huskies
 Pascal Corbeil, Defenceman, Blainville-Boisbriand Armada
 Antoine Morand, Centre, Acadie–Bathurst Titan
 Maxime Comtois, Left Wing, Victoriaville Tigres
 Vitalii Abramov, Right Wing, Gatineau Olympiques

See also
 List of QMJHL seasons
 2015 in ice hockey
 2016 in ice hockey
 2015–16 OHL season
 2015–16 WHL season
 2016 Memorial Cup

References

External links
 Official QMJHL website
 Official CHL website
 Official website of the Subway Super Series

Quebec Major Junior Hockey League seasons
Qmjhl